This is a list of important publications in philosophy, organized by field. The publications on this list are regarded as important because they have served or are serving as one or more of the following roles:
 Foundation – A publication whose ideas would go on to be the foundation of a topic or field within philosophy.
 Breakthrough – A publication that changed or added to philosophical knowledge significantly.
 Influence – A publication that has had a significant impact on the academic study of philosophy or the world.

Historical texts

European and Islamic philosophy

Ancient philosophy 
 Heraclitus, Fragments
 Parmenides, On Nature
 Plato (early period), Apology
 Plato (early period), Crito
 Plato (early period), Euthyphro
 Plato (early period), Gorgias
 Plato (early period), Protagoras
 Plato (early transitional period), Cratylus
 Plato (early transitional period), Meno
 Plato (middle period), Phaedo
 Plato (middle period), Symposium
 Plato (late transitional period), Parmenides
 Plato (late transitional period), Theaetetus
 Plato (late transitional period), Phaedrus
 Plato (late period), Laws
 Plato (late period), Timaeus
 Plato (Bk. 1, early period. Bks. 2–10, late period), The Republic
 Aristotle, Organon
 Aristotle, Physics
 Aristotle, Metaphysics
 Aristotle, On the Soul
 Aristotle, Nicomachean Ethics
 Aristotle, Politics
 Aristotle, Rhetoric
 Aristotle, Poetics
 Epicurus, (341 – 270 BC), On Nature
 Lucretius, On the Nature of Things
 Cicero, (106 – 43 BC), On the Commonwealth
 Cicero, On the Laws
 Lucius Annaeus Seneca (4BC  – 65AD), Letters from a Stoic
 Marcus Aurelius (161 – 180 AD), Meditations
 Epictetus (108 AD), Discourses
 Epictetus (125 AD), Enchiridion
 Sextus Empiricus (c. 160 – 210 AD), Outlines of Pyrrhonism
 Plotinus (270 AD), Enneads
 Porphyry (c. 234 – 305 AD), Isagoge
 Hermes Trismegistus, Corpus Hermeticum

Medieval philosophy 
 Augustine of Hippo, Confessions, c. AD 397
 Augustine of Hippo, The City of God, early 5th century
 Proclus, The Elements of Theology
Damascius, Difficulties and Solutions of First Principles
 Boethius, Consolation of Philosophy, c. 500
 Eriugena, Periphyseon
 Avicenna, The Book of Healing
 Avicenna, Proof of the Truthful
 Maimonides, Guide for the Perplexed
 Maimonides, Mishneh Torah
 Yehuda Halevi, Kuzari
 Saadia Gaon, Emunoth ve-Deoth
 Al-Ghazali, The Incoherence of the Philosophers
 Averroes, The Incoherence of the Incoherence
 Anselm, Proslogion
 Thomas Aquinas, Summa contra Gentiles, c. 1260
 Thomas Aquinas, Summa Theologiae
 Duns Scotus, Ordinatio (aka Opus Oxoniense)
 Ibn Taymiyyah, Refutation of the Rationalists
 William of Ockham, Summa Logicae

Early modern philosophy 

 Desiderius Erasmus, The Praise of Folly, 1509 (printed 1511)
 Niccolò Machiavelli, The Prince, 1513 (printed 1532)
 Niccolò Machiavelli, Discourses on Livy, 1517 (printed 1533)
 Michel de Montaigne, Essays, 1570–1592 (printed 1580–1595) 
 Sir Francis Bacon, Novum Organum, 1620
 Hugo Grotius, De jure belli ac pacis, 1625
 René Descartes, Rules for the Direction of the Mind, 1628
 René Descartes, Discourse on the Method, 1637
 René Descartes, Meditations on First Philosophy, 1641
 René Descartes, Principles of Philosophy, 1644
 René Descartes, Passions of the Soul, 1649
 Thomas Hobbes, Leviathan, 1651
 Blaise Pascal, Pensées, 1670
 Baruch Spinoza, Ethics, 1677
 Baruch Spinoza, Tractatus Theologico-Politicus, 1677
 Gottfried Leibniz, Discourse on Metaphysics, 1686
 Nicolas Malebranche, Dialogues on Metaphysics, 1688
 John Locke, Two Treatises of Government, 1689
 John Locke, An Essay Concerning Human Understanding, 1689
 Anne Conway, The Principles of the Most Ancient and Modern Philosophy, 1690
 Gottfried Leibniz, New Essays on Human Understanding, 1704 (printed 1765)
 George Berkeley, Treatise Concerning the Principles of Human Knowledge, 1710
 Gottfried Leibniz, Théodicée, 1710
 Gottfried Leibniz, Monadology, 1714 (printed 1720)
 Giambattista Vico, The New Science, 1725, 1730, 1744
 Francis Hutcheson, An Inquiry into the Original of our Ideas of Beauty and Virtue, 1725
 David Hume, A Treatise of Human Nature, 1738–1740
 Julien Offray de La Mettrie, Man a Machine, 1747
 David Hume, An Enquiry Concerning Human Understanding, 1748
 Montesquieu, The Spirit of the Laws, 1748
 Jean-Jacques Rousseau, Discourse on the Arts and Sciences, 1750
 Jean le Rond d'Alembert, Preliminary Discourse to the Encyclopédie of Diderot, 1751
 David Hume, An Enquiry Concerning the Principles of Morals, 1751
 Jean-Jacques Rousseau, Discourse on the Origin and Basis of Inequality Among Men, 1754
 Adam Smith, The Theory of Moral Sentiments, 1759
 Voltaire, Candide, 1759
 Jean-Jacques Rousseau, Emile, or On Education, 1762
 Jean-Jacques Rousseau, The Social Contract, 1762
 Voltaire, Treatise on Tolerance, 1763
 Thomas Reid, Inquiry into the Human Mind on the Principles of Common Sense, 1764
 Adam Smith, The Wealth of Nations, 1776
 Immanuel Kant, Critique of Pure Reason, 1781
 Immanuel Kant, Groundwork of the Metaphysic of Morals, 1785
 Thomas Reid, Essays on the Intellectual Powers of Man, 1785
 Immanuel Kant, Critique of Practical Reason, 1788
 Jeremy Bentham, An Introduction to the Principles of Morals and Legislation, 1789
 Edmund Burke, Reflections on the Revolution in France, 1790
 Immanuel Kant, Critique of Judgement, 1790
 Marquis de Condorcet, Sketch for a Historical Picture of the Progress of the Human Mind, 1794
 Joseph de Maistre, Considerations on France, 1797
 Sophie de Condorcet, Letters on Sympathy, 1798
 Thomas Paine, Rights of Man, 1791
 Mary Wollstonecraft, A Vindication of the Rights of Women, 1792
 Johann Gottlieb Fichte, Foundations of the Science of Knowledge, 1794

Nineteenth-century philosophy 
 Georg Wilhelm Friedrich Hegel, Phenomenology of Spirit, 1807
 Georg Wilhelm Friedrich Hegel, Science of Logic, 1812–1817
 Georg Wilhelm Friedrich Hegel, The Philosophy of Right, 1820
 Georg Wilhelm Friedrich Hegel, The Philosophy of History, printed 1837
 Arthur Schopenhauer, The World as Will and Representation, 1819–1859
 Auguste Comte, Course of Positive Philosophy, 1830–1842
 Søren Kierkegaard, Either/Or, 1843
 Søren Kierkegaard, Fear and Trembling, 1843
 Søren Kierkegaard, The Concept of Anxiety, 1844
 Søren Kierkegaard, Concluding Unscientific Postscript to Philosophical Fragments, 1846
 Max Stirner, The Ego and Its Own, 1844
 Karl Marx, The Communist Manifesto, 1848
 Karl Marx, Das Kapital, 1867–1894
 John Stuart Mill, On Liberty, 1859
 John Stuart Mill, Utilitarianism, 1861–1863
 John Stuart Mill, Harriet Taylor Mill, The Subjection of Women, 1869
 Herbert Spencer, System of Synthetic Philosophy, 1862–1892
 Henry Sidgwick, The Methods of Ethics, 1874
 Friedrich Nietzsche, Thus Spoke Zarathustra, 1883–1891
 Friedrich Nietzsche, Beyond Good and Evil, 1886
 Friedrich Nietzsche, On the Genealogy of Morals, 1887
 Henri Bergson, Time and Free Will, 1889
 Henri Bergson, Matter and Memory, 1896

Asian philosophy

Indian philosophy 
 The Upanishads
 The Bhagavad Gita ("The Song of God")
 Samkhya school
 Isvarakrsna, Sankhya Karika
 Nyaya school
 Aksapada Gautama, Nyaya Sutras
 Vaisheshika school
 Kanada, Vaisheshika Sutra
 Yoga school
 Patañjali, Yoga Sutras
 Swami Swatamarama, Hatha Yoga Pradipika
 Vedanta school
 Vyasa, Brahma Sutras
 Mīmāṃsā school
 Jaimini, Purva Mīmāṃsā Sutras
 Jainism / Jain literature
 Jain Scriptures
 Jain Agamas (Digambara)
 Jain Agamas (Śvētāmbara)
 Buddhism / Buddhist texts
 Pāli Canon
 Mahayana sutras
 Tamil
 Thiruvalluvar, Thirukkural

Chinese philosophy

Zhou Dynasty 
 Kongzi, Analects (likely written later by followers)
 Kongzi, Five Classics (compiled)
 Sun tzu, Art of War
 Laozi, Dao De Jing

Warring States 
 Mengzi, [The] Mengzi 
 Mo Tzu, Mozi
 Zhuangzi, Chuang Tzu
 Han Fei, [The] Han Feizi

Song Dynasty 
 The Record of Linji
 Zhou Dunyi, The Taiji Tushuo
 Zhu Xi, Four Books [compiled]
 Zhu Xi, Reflections on Things at Hand, 1175

Japanese philosophy

Pre-Meiji Buddhism 
 Kukai, Attaining Enlightenment in this Very Existence, 817
 Honen, One-Sheet Document, 1212
 Shinran, Kyogyoshinsho, 1224
 Dogen Zenji, Shōbōgenzō, 1231–1253
 Hakuin Ekaku, Wild Ivy

Early modern 
 Zeami Motokiyo, Style and Flower, approx. 1400 AD
 Miyamoto Musashi, The Book of Five Rings, approx. 1600 AD

Logic and philosophy of logic 
 Charles Sanders Peirce, "How to Make Our Ideas Clear", 1878
 Gottlob Frege, Begriffsschrift, 1879
 Bertrand Russell and Alfred North Whitehead, Principia Mathematica, 1910–13/1925–27
 Kurt Gödel, "On Formally Undecidable Propositions of Principia Mathematica and Related Systems", 1931
 Frank P. Ramsey, Foundations of Mathematics and other Logical Essays, 1931
 Alfred Tarski, "The Concept of Truth in Formalized Languages", 1933/1956
 Alfred Tarski, Introduction to Logic and to the Methodology of the Deductive Sciences, 1941/1994
 Wilfrid Sellars, "Inference and Meaning", 1953
 Alfred Tarski, Logic, Semantics, Metamathematics: Papers from 1923 to 1938, 1956/1983
 William Kneale and Martha Kneale, The Development of Logic, 1962
 Saul Kripke, "Semantical Considerations on Modal Logic", 1963
 Donald Davidson, "Truth and Meaning", 1967
 Willard Van Orman Quine, Philosophy of Logic, 1970/1986
 David K. Lewis, Counterfactuals, 1973
 Susan Haack, Philosophy of Logics, 1978
 Peter Spirtes, Clark Glymour, and Richard Scheines, Causation, Prediction, and Search, 1993
 Robert Brandom, Articulating Reasons: An Introduction to Inferentialism, 2000

Philosophy of language 
 Gottlob Frege, "On Sense and Reference", 1892
 Bertrand Russell, "On Denoting", 1905
 Ludwig Wittgenstein, Tractatus Logico-Philosophicus (also called The Tractatus), 1921
 A. J. Ayer, Language, Truth, and Logic, 1936
 Ludwig Wittgenstein, Philosophical Investigations, 1953
 J. L. Austin, How To Do Things With Words, 1955/1962
 J. L. Austin, "A Plea for Excuses", 1956
 Willard Van Orman Quine, Word and Object, 1960
 H. Paul Grice, "Logic and Conversation", 1967/1987
 Stanley Cavell, Must We Mean What We Say? A Book of Essays, 1969/1976
 John Searle, Speech Acts: An Essay in the Philosophy of Language, 1969
 Saul Kripke, Naming and Necessity, 1972/1980
 David K. Lewis, "General Semantics", 1972
 Donald Davidson, "Radical Interpretation", 1973
 Donald Davidson, "On the Very Idea of a Conceptual Scheme", 1973
 Michael Dummett, Frege: Philosophy of Language, 1973/1981
 Michael Devitt and Kim Sterelny, Language and Reality: An Introduction to the Philosophy of Language, 1987/1999
 Cora Diamond, The Realistic Spirit: Wittgenstein, Philosophy, and the Mind, 1991
 Robert Brandom, Making it Explicit: Reasoning, Representing, and Discursive Commitment, 1994
 John McDowell, Meaning, Knowledge and Reality, 1998

Epistemology 
 Bertrand Russell, The Problems of Philosophy, 1912
 G. E. Moore, "A Defence of Common Sense", 1925
 Jacques Maritain, The Degrees of Knowledge, 1932
 Olaf Helmer and Nicholas Rescher, "On the Epistemology of the Inexact Sciences", 1959
 Edmund Gettier, "Is Justified True Belief Knowledge?", 1963
 Roderick Chisholm, Theory of Knowledge, 1966/1989
 W. V. O. Quine, "Epistemology Naturalized", 1971
 Peter Unger, Ignorance: A Case for Scepticism, 1975
 Richard Rorty, Philosophy and the Mirror of Nature, 1979
 Stanley Cavell, The Claim of Reason: Wittgenstein, Skepticism, Morality, and Tragedy, 1979
 Alvin Goldman, "What is Justified Belief?", 1979
Ernest Sosa, "The Raft and the Pyramid: Coherence versus Foundations in the Theory of Knowledge", 1980
 Laurence Bonjour, The Structure of Empirical Knowledge, 1985
 John Hardwig, "Epistemic Dependence", 1985
 Alvin Goldman, Epistemology and Cognition, 1986
 Stephen Stich, The Fragmentation of Reason: Preface to a Pragmatic Theory of Cognitive Evaluation, 1990
 Susan Haack, Evidence and Inquiry: Towards Reconstruction in Epistemology, 1993/2009
 John McDowell, Mind and World, 1994
 David K. Lewis, "Elusive Knowledge", 1996
 Alvin Goldman, Knowledge in a Social World, 1999
 Jürgen Habermas, "Truth and Justification", 1999
 Timothy Williamson, Knowledge and its Limits, 2000
 Donald Davidson, Subjective, Intersubjective, Objective, 2001
 Hilary Kornblith, Knowledge and its Place in Nature, 2002
 Jonathan Kvanvig, The Value of Knowledge and the Pursuit of Understanding, 2003
 Michael A. Bishop and J. D. Trout, Epistemology and the Psychology of Human Judgment, 2005
 Jason Stanley, Knowledge and Practical Interests, 2005
 Miranda Fricker, Epistemic Injustice: Power and the Ethics of Knowing, 2007
 Keith DeRose, The Case for Contextualism: Knowledge, Skepticism, and Context, 2009

Metaphysics 
 Henri Bergson, "Introduction to Metaphysics", 1903
 G. E. Moore, "The Refutation of Idealism", 1903
 Henri Bergson, Creative Evolution, 1907
 William James, Pragmatism: A New Name for Some Old Ways of Thinking, 1907
 John Dewey, Experience and Nature, 1925/1929
 Alfred North Whitehead, Process and Reality, 1929
 R. G. Collingwood, An Essay on Metaphysics, 1940
 W. V. O. Quine, "On What There Is", 1948
 Rudolf Carnap, Meaning and Necessity: A Study in Semantics and Modal Logic, 1947/1956
 Rudolf Carnap, "Empiricism, Semantics, and Ontology", 1950
 W. V. O. Quine, "Two Dogmas of Empiricism", 1951
 Errol Harris, The Foundations of Metaphysics in Science, 1965
 Saul Kripke, Naming and Necessity, 1972/1980
 D. M. Armstrong, Universals and Scientific Realism, 1978
 W. V. O. Quine, Theories and Things, 1981
 Seyyed Hossein Nasr, Knowledge and the Sacred, 1981
 Derek Parfit, Reasons and Persons, 1984
 David K. Lewis, On the Plurality of Worlds, 1986
 Peter van Inwagen, Metaphysics, 1993/2015
 Nicholas Rescher, Process Metaphysics: An Introduction to Process Philosophy, 1996
 E. J. Lowe, The Possibility of Metaphysics: Substance, Identity, and Time, 1998
 Stephen Mumford, Dispositions, 1998
 Amie Thomasson, Fiction and Metaphysics, 1999
 Theodore Sider, Writing the Book of the World, 2011
 David Chalmers, Constructing the World, 2012
 Timothy Williamson, Modal Logic as Metaphysics, 2013

Philosophy of mind 
 Gilbert Ryle, The Concept of Mind, 1949
 Wilfrid Sellars, "Empiricism and the Philosophy of Mind", 1956
 Herbert Feigl, "The 'Mental' and the 'Physical'", 1958
 David K. Lewis, "An Argument for the Identity Theory", 1966
 Thomas Nagel, "What Is it Like to Be a Bat?", 1974
 Jerry Fodor, The Language of Thought, 1975
 Hilary Putnam, "The Meaning of 'Meaning'", 1975
 Tyler Burge, "Individualism and the Mental", 1979
 Paul Churchland, "Eliminative Materialism and Propositional Attitudes", 1981
 Jerry Fodor, The Modularity of Mind: An Essay on Faculty Psychology, 1983
 John Searle, Intentionality: An Essay in the Philosophy of Mind, 1983
 Stephen Stich, From Folk Psychology to Cognitive Science: The Case Against Belief, 1983
 Ruth Garrett Millikan, Language, Thought, and Other Biological Categories: New Foundations for Realism, 1984
 Patricia Churchland, Neurophilosophy: Toward a Unified Science of the Mind-Brain, 1986
 Thomas Nagel, The View from Nowhere, 1986
 Mark Johnson, The Body in the Mind: The Bodily Basis of Meaning, Imagination, and Reason, 1987
 Roger Penrose, The Emperor's New Mind: Concerning Computers, Minds and The Laws of Physics, 1989
 Daniel Dennett, Consciousness Explained, 1991
 Francisco J. Varela, Evan Thompson, and Eleanor Rosch, The Embodied Mind: Cognitive Science and Human Experience, 1991
 David Chalmers, The Conscious Mind, 1996
 Andy Clark, Being There: Putting Brain, Body and World Together Again, 1997
 Andy Clark & David Chalmers, The Extended Mind, 1998
 Shaun Gallagher, How the Body Shapes the Mind, 2005
 Andy Clark, Supersizing the Mind: Embodiment, Action, and Cognitive Extension, 2008
 David Chalmers, The Character of Consciousness, 2010
 Cordelia Fine, Delusions of Gender: How Our Minds, Society, and Neurosexism Create Difference, 2010
 Evan Thompson, Mind in Life, 2010
 Andy Clark, Surfing Uncertainty: Prediction, Action, and the Embodied Mind, 2015

Philosophy of religion 
 William James, "The Will to Believe", 1896
 William James, The Varieties of Religious Experience: A Study in Human Nature, 1902
 Aldous Huxley, The Perennial Philosophy, 1945
 Alvin Plantinga, God and Other Minds: A Study of the Rational Justification of Belief in God, 1967
 Dewi Zephaniah Phillips, Religion Without Explanation, 1976
 Richard Swinburne, The Existence of God, 1979
 William Lane Craig, The Kalam Cosmological Argument, 1979
 Alvin Plantinga, "Is Belief in God Properly Basic?", 1981
 Jean-Luc Marion, God Without Being, 1982
 J. L. Mackie, The Miracle of Theism: Arguments for and against the Existence of God, 1982
 John Hick, An Interpretation of Religion: Human Responses to the Transcendent, 1989/2004
 William Alston, Perceiving God: The Epistemology of Religious Experience, 1991
 J. L. Schellenberg, Divine Hiddenness and Human Reason, 1993
 William L. Rowe, "The Evidential Argument from Evil: A Second Look", 1996
 Alvin Plantinga, Warranted Christian Belief, 2000
 Jay L. Garfield, Empty Words: Buddhist Philosophy and Cross-Cultural Interpretation, 2001
 Keith Yandell, Philosophy of Religion: A Contemporary Introduction, 2002

Philosophy of mathematics 
 Gottlob Frege, The Foundations of Arithmetic, 1884
 Alfred North Whitehead and Bertrand Russell, Principia Mathematica, 1910–13/1925–27
 Bertrand Russell, Introduction to Mathematical Philosophy, 1919
 Eugene Wigner, "The Unreasonable Effectiveness of Mathematics in the Natural Sciences", 1960
 Paul Benacerraf and Hilary Putnam, Philosophy of Mathematics: Selected Readings, 1964/1983
 Paul Benacerraf, "What Numbers Could not Be", 1965
 Paul Benacerraf, "Mathematical Truth", 1973
 Ian Hacking, The Emergence of Probability: A Philosophical Study of Early Ideas about Probability, Induction and Statistical Inference, 1975
 Imre Lakatos, Proofs and Refutations, 1976
 Hartry Field, Science without Numbers: A Defence of Nominalism, 1980/2016
 Penelope Maddy, Realism in Mathematics, 1990
 George Boolos, Logic, Logic and Logic, 1998
 Mark Colyvan, The Indispensability of Mathematics, 2001
 Penelope Maddy, Second Philosophy: A Naturalistic Method, 2007

Philosophy of science 
 William Whewell, The Philosophy of the Inductive Sciences: Founded upon their History, 1840
 John Stuart Mill, A System of Logic, Ratiocinative and Inductive, 1843
 William Stanley Jevons, The Principles of Science: A Treatise on Logic and Scientific Method, 1874
 Charles Sanders Peirce, Illustrations of the Logic of Science, 1877–1878
 Karl Pearson, The Grammar of Science, 1892
 Henri Poincaré, Science and Hypothesis, 1902, and The Value of Science, 1905
 Hermann Weyl, Philosophy of Mathematics and Natural Science, 1927/1949
 Otto Neurath, "Physicalism: The Philosophy of the Viennese Circle", 1931
 Karl Popper, The Logic of Scientific Discovery, 1934/1959
 John Dewey, Logic: The Theory of Inquiry, 1938
 Rudolf Carnap, Logical Foundations of Probability, 1950/1962
 Hans Reichenbach, The Rise of Scientific Philosophy, 1951
 Stephen Toulmin, The Philosophy of Science: An Introduction, 1953
 Nelson Goodman, Fact, Fiction, and Forecast, 1955
 Michael Polanyi, Personal Knowledge: Towards a Post-critical Philosophy, 1958
 Ernest Nagel, The Structure of Science: Problems in the Logic of Scientific Explanation, 1961
 Thomas Kuhn, The Structure of Scientific Revolutions, 1962/1996
 Carl Gustav Hempel, Aspects of Scientific Explanation and Other Essays in the Philosophy of Science, 1965
 Mario Bunge, Scientific Research: Strategy and Philosophy (republished in 1998 as Philosophy of Science), 1967
 Stephen Toulmin, Human Understanding: The Collective Use and Evolution of Concepts, 1972
 Mario Bunge, Treatise on Basic Philosophy, 8 volumes, 1974–1989
 Michael Friedman, "Explanation and Scientific Understanding", 1974
 Roy Bhaskar, A Realist Theory of Science, 1975
 Paul Feyerabend, Against Method: Outline of an Anarchistic Theory of Knowledge, 1975/1993
 Larry Laudan, Progress and its Problems: Towards a Theory of Scientific Growth, 1978
 David K. Lewis, "How to Define Theoretical Terms", 1979
 Marx W. Wartofsky, Models: Representation and the Scientific Understanding, 1979
 Bas C. van Fraassen, The Scientific Image, 1980
 Carolyn Merchant, The Death of Nature: Women, Ecology, and the Scientific Revolution, 1980
 Wesley C. Salmon, Scientific Explanation and the Causal Structure of the World, 1984
 Steven Shapin and Simon Schaffer, Leviathan and the Air-Pump: Hobbes, Boyle, and the Experimental Life, 1985
 Ronald Giere, Explaining Science: A Cognitive Approach, 1988
 David Hull, Science as a Process: An Evolutionary Account of the Social and Conceptual Development of Science, 1988
 Paul Thagard, Computational Philosophy of Science, 1988
 Helen Longino, Science as Social Knowledge: Values and Objectivity in Scientific Inquiry, 1990
 Peter Achinstein, Particles and Waves: Historical Essays in the Philosophy of Science, 1991
 Lorraine Code, What Can She Know? Feminist Theory and the Construction of Knowledge, 1991
 Sandra Harding, Whose Science? Whose Knowledge? Thinking from Women's Lives, 1991
 Paul Thagard, Conceptual Revolutions, 1992
 John Dupré, The Disorder of Things: Metaphysical Foundations of the Disunity of Science, 1993
 Deborah Mayo, Error and the Growth of Experimental Knowledge, 1996
 E. O. Wilson, Consilience: The Unity of Knowledge, 1998
 John Ziman, Real Science: What it Is, and What it Means, 2000
 Patrick Suppes, Representation and Invariance of Scientific Structures, 2002
 Hasok Chang, Inventing Temperature: Measurement and Scientific Progress, 2004
 William C. Wimsatt, Re-Engineering Philosophy for Limited Beings: Piecewise Approximations to Reality, 2007
 Nancy J. Nersessian, Creating Scientific Concepts, 2008
 Heather Douglas, Science, Policy, and the Value-Free Ideal, 2009
 Peter Godfrey-Smith, Theory and Reality: An Introduction to the Philosophy of Science, 2009
 William Bechtel and Robert C. Richardson, Discovering Complexity: Decomposition and Localization as Strategies in Scientific Research, 2010

Philosophy of physics 
 Pierre Duhem, The Aim and Structure of Physical Theory, 1906
 Albert Einstein, The Meaning of Relativity, 1922
 Hans Reichenbach, The Philosophy of Space and Time, 1928/1957
 Albert Einstein, Boris Podolsky, Nathan Rosen, "Can Quantum-Mechanical Description of Physical Reality be Considered Complete?", 1935
 Arthur Eddington, Philosophy of Physical Science, 1939
 Werner Heisenberg, Physics and Philosophy: The Revolution in Modern Science, 1958
 Adolf Grünbaum, Philosophical Problems of Space and Time, 1963/1973
 John Stewart Bell, "On the Einstein–Podolsky–Rosen Paradox", 1964
 Rudolf Carnap, Philosophical Foundations of Physics, 1966
 Lawrence Sklar, Space, Time, and Spacetime, 1974
 Nancy Cartwright, How the Laws of Physics Lie, 1983
 Michael Friedman, Foundations of Space-Time Theories: Relativistic Physics and the Philosophy of Science, 1983
 John Stewart Bell, Speakable and Unspeakable in Quantum Mechanics: Collected Papers on Quantum Philosophy, 1987/2004
 Lawrence Sklar, Philosophy of Physics, 1992
 Lawrence Sklar, Physics and Chance: Philosophical Issues in the Foundations of Statistical Mechanics, 1993
 Roland Omnès, Quantum Philosophy: Understanding and Interpreting Contemporary Science, 1994/1999
 Jeffrey Bub, Interpreting the Quantum World, 1997
 Roberto Torretti, The Philosophy of Physics, 1999
 Craig Callender and Nick Huggett, Physics Meets Philosophy at the Planck Scale: Contemporary Theories in Quantum Gravity, 2001
 Harvey Brown, Physical Relativity: Space-time Structure from a Dynamical Perspective, 2005
 Laura Ruetsche, Interpreting Quantum Theories: The Art of the Possible, 2011

Philosophy of biology 
 Erwin Schrödinger, What is Life? The Physical Aspect of the Living Cell, 1945
 David Hull, Philosophy of Biological Science, 1974
 Stephen Jay Gould and Richard Lewontin, "The Spandrels of San Marco and the Panglossian Paradigm: A Critique of the Adaptationist Programme", 1979
 Stephen Jay Gould, The Mismeasure of Man, 1981/1996
 Richard Dawkins, The Extended Phenotype, 1982
 Ernst Mayr, The Growth of Biological Thought: Diversity, Evolution, and Inheritance, 1982
 Elliott Sober, The Nature of Selection: Evolutionary Theory in Philosophical Focus, 1984
 Michael Ruse, Taking Darwin Seriously: A Naturalistic Approach to Philosophy, 1986
 Kristin Shrader-Frechette and Earl D. McCoy, Method in Ecology: Strategies for Conservation, 1993
 Elliott Sober, Philosophy of Biology, 1993/2000
 Daniel C. Dennett, Darwin's Dangerous Idea: Evolution and the Meanings of Life, 1995
 Martin Mahner and Mario Bunge, Foundations of Biophilosophy, 1997
 Kim Sterelny and Paul E. Griffiths, Sex and Death: An Introduction to Philosophy of Biology, 1999
 Sandra Mitchell, Biological Complexity and Integrative Pluralism, 2003
 Denis Noble, The Music of Life: Biology Beyond the Genome, 2006
 Samir Okasha, Evolution and the Levels of Selection, 2006
 Elliott Sober, Evidence and Evolution: The Logic Behind the Science, 2008
 Michael Ruse, The Philosophy of Human Evolution, 2010

Philosophy of chemistry 
 Eric Scerri and Lee C. McIntyre, "The Case for the Philosophy of Chemistry", 1997
 Davis Baird, Eric Scerri, and Lee C. McIntyre (eds.), Philosophy of Chemistry: Synthesis of a New Discipline, 2006

Philosophy of psychology 
 William James, The Principles of Psychology, 1890
 B. F. Skinner, Science and Human Behavior, 1953
 Abraham Kaplan, The Conduct of Inquiry: Methodology for Behavioral Science, 1964
 Paul E. Meehl, "Theory-Testing in Psychology and Physics: A Methodological Paradox", 1967
 Roy Bhaskar, The Possibility of Naturalism: A Philosophical Critique of the Contemporary Human Sciences, 1979/2015
 John Robert Anderson, Cognitive Psychology and its Implications, 1980/2019
 Ned Block (ed.), Readings in Philosophy of Psychology, 1981
 Mario Bunge and Rubén Ardilla, Philosophy of Psychology, 1987
 Paul E. Meehl, "Theoretical Risks and Tabular Asterisks: Sir Karl, Sir Ronald, and the Slow Progress of Soft Psychology", 1992
 George Botterill and Peter Carruthers, The Philosophy of Psychology, 1999
 Steven Pinker, The Blank Slate: The Modern Denial of Human Nature, 2002
 Jesse Prinz, Gut Reactions: A Perceptual Theory of Emotion, 2004

Philosophy of economics 
 Lionel Robbins, An Essay on the Nature and Significance of Economic Science, 1932
 Kenneth Arrow, Social Choice and Individual Values, 1951/1963
 Ludwig von Mises, The Ultimate Foundation of Economic Science, 1962
 Joan Robinson, Economic Philosophy, 1962
 Kenneth E. Boulding, "Economics as a Moral Science", 1969
 Amartya Sen, On Economic Inequality, 1973
 Elizabeth S. Anderson, Value in Ethics and Economics, 1993
 Paul Ormerod, The Death of Economics, 1994
 Amartya Sen, Development as Freedom, 1999
 Steve Keen, Debunking Economics: The Naked Emperor of the Social Sciences, 2001/2011

Ethics 
 G. E. Moore, Principia Ethica, 1903
 John Dewey and James Hayden Tufts, Ethics, 1908/1932
 W. D. Ross, The Right and the Good, 1930
 G. E. M. Anscombe, "Modern Moral Philosophy", 1958
 C. H. Waddington, The Ethical Animal, 1960
 Peter Singer, "Famine, Affluence, and Morality", 1972
 J. L. Mackie, Ethics: Inventing Right and Wrong, 1977
 Sissela Bok, Lying: Moral Choice in Public and Private Life, 1978
 Philippa Foot, Virtues and Vices: And Other Essays in Moral Philosophy, 1978
 Alan Gewirth, Reason and Morality, 1978
 Peter Singer, Practical Ethics, 1979/2011
 Alasdair MacIntyre, After Virtue, 1981/2007
 Samuel Scheffler, The Rejection of Consequentialism, 1982/1994
 Derek Parfit, Reasons and Persons, 1984
 Bernard Williams, Ethics and the Limits of Philosophy, 1985
 David Gauthier, Morals by Agreement, 1986
 Peter Railton, "Moral Realism", 1986
 Martha Nussbaum, The Fragility of Goodness: Luck and Ethics in Greek Tragedy and Philosophy, 1986
 Paul W. Taylor, Respect for Nature: A Theory of Environmental Ethics, 1986
 Holmes Rolston III, Environmental Ethics: Duties to and Values in the Natural World, 1988
 Susan Hurley, Natural Reasons: Personality and Polity, 1989
 Shelly Kagan, The Limits of Morality, 1989
 Allan Gibbard, Wise Choices, Apt Feelings: A Theory Of Normative Judgment, 1990
 Joan Tronto, Moral Boundaries: A Political Argument for an Ethic of Care, 1993
 Annette Baier, Moral Prejudices: Essays on Ethics, 1994
 Michael A. Smith, The Moral Problem, 1994
 Christine Korsgaard, The Sources of Normativity, 1996
 Peter Unger, Living High and Letting Die: Our Illusion of Innocence, 1996
 Thomas M. Scanlon, What We Owe to Each Other, 1998
 Rosalind Hursthouse, On Virtue Ethics, 1999
 Philippa Foot, Natural Goodness, 2001
 Allan Gibbard, Thinking How to Live, 2003
 Jonathan Dancy, Ethics Without Principles, 2004 
 Michael Huemer, Ethical Intuitionism, 2005
 Virginia Held, The Ethics of Care: Personal, Political, and Global, 2006
 Derek Parfit, On What Matters, 2011/2017

Meta-ethics 
 P. F. Strawson, "Freedom and Resentment", 1962
 John McDowell, "Virtue and Reason", 1972
 John McDowell, "Non-Cognitivism and Rule-Following", 1981
 Jürgen Habermas, Justification and Application: Remarks on Discourse Ethics, 1993

Bioethics 
 Paul Ramsey, Fabricated Man: The Ethics of Genetic Control, 1970
 Paul Ramsey, The Patient as Person: Explorations in Medical Ethics, 1970
 Judith Jarvis Thomson, "A Defense of Abortion", 1971
 Don Marquis, "Why Abortion is Immoral", 1989

Aesthetics 
 Benedetto Croce, Aesthetic: As Science of Expression and General Linguistic, 1902
 Jacques Maritain, Art and Scholasticism, 1920
 John Dewey, Art as Experience, 1934
 R. G. Collingwood, The Principles of Art, 1938
 Susanne Langer, Problems of Art: Ten Philosophical Lectures, 1957
 Monroe Beardsley, Aesthetics: Problems in the Philosophy of Criticism, 1958
 George Kubler, The Shape of Time: Remarks on the History of Things, 1962
 Virgil Aldrich, Philosophy of Art, 1963
 Nelson Goodman, Languages of Art: An Approach to a Theory of Symbols, 1968/1976
 Richard Wollheim, Art and Its Objects, 1968 
 Rudolf Arnheim, Visual Thinking, 1969
 Theodor Adorno, Aesthetic Theory, 1970
 Richard Schechner, Essays on Performance Theory, 1976/2004
 Arthur Danto, The Transfiguration of the Commonplace: A Philosophy of Art, 1981
 Noël Carroll, The Philosophy of Horror, or Paradoxes of the Heart, 1990
 Kendall Walton, Mimesis as Make-Believe: On The Foundations of the Representational Arts, 1990
 Richard Shusterman, Pragmatist Aesthetics: Living Beauty, Rethinking Art, 1992/2000
 Arthur Danto, After the End of Art: Contemporary Art and the Pale of History, 1997
 Berys Gaut, Art, Emotion and Ethics, 2007

Social philosophy

Identity 
 Edward Said, Orientalism, 1978
 Judith Butler, "Performative Acts and Gender Constitution", 1988
 Judith Butler, Gender Trouble, 1990
 Kwame Anthony Appiah, The Ethics of Identity, 2005
 Sara Ahmed, On Being Included: Racism and Diversity in Institutional Life, 2012
 Sally Haslanger, Resisting Reality: Social Construction and Social Critique, 2012

Philosophy of education 
 John Dewey, Democracy and Education, 1916
 B.F. Skinner, Walden Two, 1948
 Paulo Freire, Pedagogy of the Oppressed, 1968

Philosophy of history 
 Maurice Mandelbaum, The Problem of Historical Knowledge: An Answer to Relativism, 1938
 R. G. Collingwood, The Idea of History, 1946
 Karl Löwith, Meaning in History: The Theological Implications of the Philosophy of History, 1949
 Patrick Gardiner, The Nature of Historical Explanation, 1952
 Muhsin Mahdi, Ibn Khaldun's Philosophy of History: A Study in the Philosophic Foundation of the Science of Culture, 1957
 E. H. Carr, What Is History?, 1961
 Arthur Danto, Analytical Philosophy of History, 1965

Philosophy of law 
 Roscoe Pound, An Introduction to the Philosophy of Law, 1954
 H. L. A. Hart, The Concept of Law, 1961
 Lon L. Fuller, The Morality of Law, 1964/1969
 Ronald Dworkin, Taking Rights Seriously, 1977
 John Finnis, Natural Law and Natural Rights, 1980/2011
 David Lyons, Ethics and the Rule of Law, 1984
 Ronald Dworkin, Law's Empire, 1986

Political philosophy 
 Jacques Maritain, Integral Humanism: Temporal and Spiritual Problems of a New Christendom, 1936
 John Dewey, Freedom and Culture, 1939
 Jacques Maritain, The Rights of Man and Natural Law, 1942
 Friedrich Hayek, The Road to Serfdom, 1944
 Karl Popper, The Open Society and Its Enemies, 1945
 Hannah Arendt, The Origins of Totalitarianism, 1951
 Isaiah Berlin, "Two Concepts of Liberty", 1958
 Bruno Leoni, Freedom and the Law, 1961
 John Rawls, A Theory of Justice, 1971
 Robert Nozick, Anarchy, State, and Utopia, 1974
 Michael J. Sandel, Liberalism and the Limits of Justice, 1982/1998
 Michael Walzer, Spheres of Justice: A Defense of Pluralism and Equality, 1983
 Joseph Raz, The Morality of Freedom, 1986
 Paul Ricœur, Lectures on Ideology and Utopia, 1986
 Jürgen Habermas, Between Facts and Norms, 1992
 Axel Honneth, The Struggle for Recognition: The Moral Grammar of Social Conflicts, 1992
 John Rawls, Political Liberalism, 1993
 Will Kymlicka, Multicultural Citizenship: A Liberal Theory of Minority Rights, 1995
 Nancy Fraser, Justice Interruptus: Critical Reflections on the "Postsocialist" Condition, 1997
 Roberto Mangabeira Unger, Democracy Realized: The Progressive Alternative, 1998
 Amartya Sen, The Idea of Justice, 2009
 Alan Thomas, Republic of Equals: Predistribution and Property-Owning Democracy, 2017

Continental philosophy

Phenomenology and existentialism 
 Edmund Husserl, Logical Investigations, 1900/1901
 Edmund Husserl, Ideas Pertaining to a Pure Phenomenology and to a Phenomenological Philosophy, 1913
 Max Scheler, Formalism in Ethics and Non-Formal Ethics of Values, 1913/1916
 Martin Buber, I and Thou, 1923
 Martin Heidegger, Being and Time, 1927
 Edmund Husserl, Cartesian Meditations, 1931
 Alfred Schütz, The Phenomenology of the Social World, 1932
 Albert Camus, Myth of Sisyphus, 1942
 Jean-Paul Sartre, Being and Nothingness, 1943
 Maurice Merleau-Ponty, Phenomenology of Perception, 1945
 Jacques Maritain, Existence and the Existent, 1947
 Simone de Beauvoir, The Second Sex, 1949
 Emmanuel Levinas, Totality and Infinity, 1961
 Emmanuel Levinas, Otherwise than Being, or Beyond Essence, 1974
 Jean-Luc Marion, Being Given, 1997

Hermeneutics and deconstruction 
 Hans-Georg Gadamer, Truth and Method, 1960
 Paul Ricœur, Freud and Philosophy: An Essay on Interpretation, 1965
 Jacques Derrida, Of Grammatology, 1967
 Hans-Georg Gadamer, Philosophical Hermeneutics, 1976
 Paul Ricœur, Interpretation Theory: Discourse and the Surplus of Meaning, 1976
 Paul Ricœur, Hermeneutics and the Human Sciences: Essays on Language, Action, and Interpretation, 1981
 John McDowell, "Gadamer and Davidson on Understanding and Relativism", 2002

Structuralism and post-structuralism 
 Georges Bataille, The Accursed Share, 1949
 Michel Foucault, The Order of Things, 1966
 Gilles Deleuze, Difference and Repetition, 1968
 Gilles Deleuze, The Logic of Sense, 1969
 Gilles Deleuze and Félix Guattari, Capitalism and Schizophrenia, 1972–1980
 Jean Baudrillard, The Mirror of Production, 1973
 Luce Irigaray, Speculum of the Other Woman, 1974
 Michel Foucault, Discipline and Punish, 1975
 Jean Baudrillard, Simulacra and Simulation, 1981

Critical theory and Marxism 
 György Lukács, History and Class Consciousness: Studies in Marxist Dialectics, 1923
 Karl Korsch. Marxism and Philosophy, 1923
 Herbert Marcuse, Reason and Revolution: Hegel and the Rise of Social Theory, 1941
 Max Horkheimer and Theodor Adorno, Dialectic of Enlightenment, 1944
 Herbert Marcuse, Eros and Civilization, 1945
 Henri Lefebvre, Critique of Everyday Life, 1947, 1961, 1981
 Jean-Paul Sartre, Critique of Dialectical Reason, 1960
 Herbert Marcuse, One-Dimensional Man, 1964
 Louis Althusser, Reading Capital, 1965
 Theodor Adorno, Negative Dialectics, 1966
 Cornelius Castoriadis, The Imaginary Institution of Society, 1975
 G. A. Cohen, Karl Marx's Theory of History: A Defense, 1978
 Jürgen Habermas, The Theory of Communicative Action, 1981
 Marshall Berman, All That Is Solid Melts into Air: The Experience of Modernity, 1982
 Alain Badiou, Being and Event, 1988

Eastern philosophy 
 Kitaro Nishida, An Inquiry into the Good, 1911
 Kitaro Nishida, From the Acting to the Seeing, 1923–27
 Suzuki Daisetsu Teitaro, An Introduction to Zen Buddhism, 1934
 Feng Youlan, A History of Chinese Philosophy, 1934
 Feng Youlan, New Rational Philosophy, 1939
 "A Manifesto for a Re-appraisal of Sinology and Reconstruction of Chinese Culture", 1958
 Keiji Nishitani, Religion and Nothingness, 1961

See also
 :Category:Philosophical databases
 List of years in philosophy

Notes

External links
 Annotated Bibliography on Analysis, Stanford Encyclopedia of Philosophy.
 Epistemology Research Guide by Keith Korcz, University of Louisiana at Lafayette.
 London Philosophy Study Guide, University College London.
 What Are the Modern Classics? The Baruch Poll of Great Philosophy in the Twentieth Century, Douglas P. Lackey, Philosophical Forum 30(4): 329–346 (1999).

Publications